Saraskand-e Olya (also Romanized as Sarāskand-e ‘Olyā; also known as Āzarān-e Bālā, Sarāskand-e Bālā, Sar Eskand, and Sareskand-e Bālā) is a village in Almalu Rural District, Nazarkahrizi District, Hashtrud County, East Azerbaijan Province, Iran. At the 2006 census, its population was 133, in 22 families.

References 

Towns and villages in Hashtrud County